This Is Hell is the first EP from the band This Is Hell. After quickly forming the band and releasing a demo ep, This Is Hell returned to the studio to work on their next release. For an early release, This is Hell generated a lot of hype and received good reviews. Some critics still argue that this was the bands finest work to date. 

The sound of the EP is a continuation and expansion of the sound on their previous release. This release has more professionally done mixing and recording. It shows an even more aggressive side of the band not previously seen. Also featured on this EP are the addition of Glassjaw's singer Daryl Palumbo on the final track. The final track is also a cover of hardcore punk band 108.

Track listing
All songs written by This Is Hell, except for track 6 originally written and recorded by 108. 
 "Dead Salutes" – 2:50
 "Heaven Sent, Hell Bound" – 1:23
 "Diamond Lanterns" – 1:51
 "Moving Targets" – 2:12
 "AD Infinitum" – 2:25
 "When Death Closes Your Eyes" (108 Cover) – 2:52

Personnel
 Travis Reilly – vocals
 Rick Jimenez – guitar
 Jeff Tiu – bass and vocals
 Dan Bourke – drums
 Joe Osolin – guitar
 Daryl Palumbo – guest vocals
 Produced by Dean Baltoulnis
 Mastered by Tom Hutton
 Layout and art by Jeremy Wabiszczewicz

References

This Is Hell (band) albums
2005 EPs